Kalagaun may refer to:

 Kalagaun, Salyan
 Kalagaun, Achham

See also
 Kalegaun